Peter Maloney (born November 24, 1944) is an American actor, director, and playwright who has appeared in film, television, and theatre for over 50 years.

Career 
In 2021, he is a member of the Atlantic Theater Company, involved in 23 different productions, including The Duck Variations and The Water Engine both written by David Mamet, and The Voysey Inheritance. He joined the Ensemble Studio Theater, and the Irish Repertory Theatre, where he was involved in Ernest in Love, A Wonderful Life (musical), Port Authority (play), and The Quare Land. He is a former member of the Joseph Chaikin’s Open Theater, where he participated in many productions such as The Serpent, Ubu Cocu and Endgame.

Maloney's television and film credits are extensive (see introduction), and span from 1968 to 2020. 

Maloney was a drama teacher and director of students for five years at the Juilliard School of performing arts. Maloney has worked in the acting industry for over 50 years (2020). He is a life member of the Actors Studio and a New Dramatists alumnus.

Filmography

Film

Television

References

External links

American male film actors
American male television actors
Living people
American male stage actors
20th-century American male actors
21st-century American male actors
1944 births